Gaius Julius Agrippa (about 72 – before 150) was a Cilician Prince and the first-born son of King Gaius Julius Alexander and Queen Julia Iotapa of Cetis. He had two younger siblings: a brother called Gaius Julius Alexander Berenicianus and a sister called Julia Iotapa.

Surviving inscriptions on his family reveal that his family were related to important members of Asian, non-Jewish and Jewish aristocracy. He was of Jewish, Nabataean, Edomite, Greek, Armenian, Medes and Persian origins. His paternal grandparents were King Tigranes VI of Armenia and his wife Opgalli. Through Tigranes, he was a descendant of King Archelaus of Cappadocia, King of Judea Herod the Great and his wife Mariamne. Agrippa along with his family and paternal relatives were among the last known descendants of the Herodian Dynasty. He was an apostate to Judaism. It is unlikely that Agrippa attempted to exert influence on Judean Politics. His name indicates that the family connections from the Herodian Dynasty were not wholly broken. His maternal grandparents were King Antiochus IV of Commagene and Queen Julia Iotapa. 

The Kingdom of Cetis was a small client state in the Roman Empire. Cetis was a small region in Cilicia that was previously ruled by his Cappadocian royal ancestors and Antiochus IV. The city in Cilicia Elaiussa Sebaste was a part of the Kingdom. When his parents married in Rome in 58, then Roman Emperor Nero crowned his parents as monarchs and gave them that region to rule. He was born, raised and educated in Cetis. 

There is an honorific inscription dedicated to him as a ‘son of King Alexander’. In 94, Agrippa along with his brother Berenicianus entered the Roman Senate. Surviving inscriptions also reveal the career of Agrippa. Agrippa became and served as a Quaestor for the Roman Province of Asia. Before 109, Agrippa served as a Praetorian Guard, before his father reached and served as a consul or suffect consul. 

Agrippa married a Roman woman who belonged or was related to the Fabia gens. From this marriage Agrippa had two sons, a younger Gaius Julius Agrippa and Lucius Julius Gainius Fabius Agrippa. A possible descendant from his family was the usurper of the 3rd century Jotapianus.

Sources
 http://www.roman-emperors.org/philarab.htm
 acsearch.info ancient coin search engine: Kings of Armenia

 Bash, Anthony (1997). Ambassadors for Christ: an exploration of ambassadorial language in the New Testament, Mohr Siebeck 
 Roller, Duane W. (1998). The Building Program of Herod the Great, University of California Press, 

People from Roman Anatolia
Herodian dynasty
Agrippa, Gaius
1st-century Romans
2nd-century Romans